Vansant Airport or Van Sant Airport  is a public use airport located in Bucks County, Pennsylvania, United States and owned by the Bucks County Airport Authority. It is two nautical miles (3.7 km) southwest of the central business district of Erwinna, Pennsylvania.

History
In 1945, John Van Sant (born 1912) bought the Silver Star Airport in Langhorne, Pennsylvania, renamed it to The Old Star Airport, and started his own business, Van Sant Flying Service. The business offered crop dusting and flight training. (This airport closed about 1973 and housing development has since obliterated its existence.)  Van Sant dealt in aircraft and also bought US government surplus parts.  In 1957, he moved his business to Doylestown, Pennsylvania.  In 1960 he again moved to Erwina, Pennsylvania where he founded and owned the Van Sant Airport. Now the airport is a landmark for Classic Biplane rides, vintage airplanes, and sailplane operations  It is part of the Bucks County park system. The 198.5 acre (0.8 km2) piece of property was sold to the county for almost US$3 million. The Bucks County Airport Authority currently maintains the airport, and facilities on the field are leased to Bird Of Paradise a fixed-base operator (FBO). The Soaring Tigers sailplane nonprofit gliding club operates from the airport and provides glider flight instruction to club members.

Facilities and aircraft 
It has two runways with turf surfaces:: 7/25 is 3,058 by 120 feet (932 x 37 m) and 5G/23G is 1,340 by 200 feet (408 x 61 m).

For the 12-month period ending 10 May 2022, the airport had 4,515 aircraft operations including 15 military operations.  At that time there were 52 aircraft based at this airport: 40 single-engine, 12 gliders

As of late 2022 a glider club bases three sailplanes at the airport including a Schweizer SGS 1-34, Schweizer SGS 1-26B, and a two-place Schweizer SGS 2-33A. The airport provides glider aerotows.

References

External links

 Van Sant Airport – about Bar and Dannie
 Soaring Tigers a nonprofit club for glider pilots and glider student pilots

Airports in Pennsylvania
County airports in Pennsylvania
Transportation buildings and structures in Bucks County, Pennsylvania